The Win-3 Habitat is a small wooden structure intended for use as single person emergency shelter primarily for housing homeless individuals.  The Win-3 Habitat utilizes no internal frame-type bracing whatsoever.  Unit strength is derived from specially built corner pieces which act as load bearing structural intersections.  Win-3 Habitats are built from 1/2" grade CD plywood.  Four acrylic glass windows allow adequate illumination during daylight hours and four vents provide sufficient ventilation at all other times.  Careful dimensioning of the Win-3 Habitat allows for thirty disassembled units to fit into a single high cube shipping container.  When not in use, the Win-3 Habitats can be disassembled and returned to the container.  Assembly and disassembly time utilizing two workers is fifteen minutes per unit.  Win-3 Habitats can easily be cleaned and sanitized between each use and have an indefinite storage life.

The Win-3 Habitat was designed by naval architect Vernon Koenig and is manufactured by Stratodyne, Inc., located in Yucaipa, California.  In addition to the Win-3 Habitat, Stratodyne also manufactures emergency disaster shelters and low cost kit-built homes for third world countries.

Homelessness
House types